KQFN (1580 AM) is a commercial radio station licensed to Tempe, Arizona and serving the Phoenix metropolitan area. It is owned by CRC Broadcasting Company, Inc., and airs an all-sports radio format branded as "The Fanatic."  Morning and afternoon drive-time programming on weekdays comes from local hosts, with the nationally syndicated Jim Rome heard middays, and programming from the BetQL Audio Network, CBS Sports Radio, and Vegas Stats & Information Network (VSiN) heard nights and weekends.

The studios and offices are on East Evans Road in Scottsdale. The transmitter is located off North 38th Avenue near West Indian School Road, in Phoenix.

The station had been owned by ABC for its Radio Disney format and operated at the maximum power permitted by the Federal Communications Commission for commercial AM stations, 50,000 watts around the clock.  But in October 2015, as it was being sold, the station went silent. It returned to the air under new ownership on February 13, 2017 and is now simulcast on two FM translators,  K257CD in Phoenix, operating at 99.3 MHz and K240EU in Tempe, at 95.9 MHz. In addition, the AM station now drastically reduces its power at night to 95 watts, using a non-directional antenna, instead of the previous complicated directional antenna multi-tower array, required to maintain its former nighttime power of 50,000 watts.

1580 AM is Canadian clear-channel frequency, on which CKDO in Oshawa, Ontario is the dominant Class A station.  There are no other Class A stations on this frequency in North America.

History

KYND
The station first began broadcasting on June 1, 1960, with the call sign KYND. The station's license was assigned by the FCC on July 25, 1960. KYND was originally owned by Dick Gilbert, a singer, music editor, and disc jockey. During the period the station was KYND, it broadcast middle of the road music, and was branded as "The Kind Station".

The station originally broadcast only during daytime hours, with a power of 10,000 watts. In the mid-1960s the station's power was increased 50,000 watts during the day, with a power of 10,000 watts during critical hours. In 1966, the station's owner, Dick Gilbert sold the station to Rene Cote for $341,250, which included $148,250 for station equipment and a noncompetition agreement, and $193,000 for a 10-year consultation contract.

Buck Owens era

KTUF
In 1967, the station was purchased by Buck Owens for $350,000. Owens had the station's call letters changed to KTUF, and switched its format to country music, a field where Owens was a noted singer. In April 1969, KTUF's programming began to be simulcast on 102.5 KNIX-FM during daytime hours when KTUF was on the air, with KNIX-FM continuing the format at night. KNIX-FM had been purchased by Buck Owens the previous year.

During the period the station was KTUF, the station was branded as "All American Radio" and "All American Country Radio".

KNIX
In 1973 the station's call sign was changed to KNIX, matching the call letters of its FM sister station. In 1980, KNIX began broadcasting 24 hours a day.  From 1973 to 1985, the station aired a more traditional country sound, while sometimes simulcasting the FM station.  In 1985, the station began a fulltime simulcast of KNIX-FM.

KCWW
On January 1, 1990, the station became an affiliate of Satellite Music Network's "Real Country" format and the call sign was changed to KCWW. While its full call sign was given during station identifications, the station's primary branding and over the air identification was "KCW" with the CW standing for "Country & Western." During this period, KCWW served as the flagship station of the "Real Country" network, which station owner Buck Owens was co-owner of at the time.

In July 1998, longtime station owner Buck Owens sold the station to ABC/Disney for $8,850,000. KCWW continued to air the "Real Country" country music format until its sale, when it flipped to Radio Disney on July 27, 1998.

Radio Disney era
After the station's purchase by ABC/Disney, the station became an affiliate of the children's/contemporary hit radio network Radio Disney. On December 4, 1998, the call sign was changed to KMIK, with the MIK standing for the Disney cartoon character "Mickey Mouse." On August 13, 2014, Disney put KMIK and twenty-two other Radio Disney stations up for sale, in order to focus on digital distribution of the Radio Disney network.  Radio Disney programming for the Phoenix media market has since moved to the KOOL-FM 94.5-HD3 digital subchannel.

Gabrielle Broadcasting/CRC ownership
On August 16, 2015, ABC agreed to sell KMIK to Gabrielle Broadcasting Licensee for $1.4 million. Gabrielle is owned by Jacob J. Barker, the general manager of KXEG 1280.  Gabrielle Broadcasting planned to carry a "locally focused spoken word format".  KMIK would also change its call letters to KHEP. Gabrielle consummated the purchase on October 20, 2015.

On October 14, 2015, KMIK signed off the air to allow for a transmitter relocation.  While off the air, Gabrielle Broadcasting asked the FCC to change its call letters to KHEP, which were the longtime call letters of 1280 from 1956 until 1999.  AM 1280 is now known as KXEG. Gabrielle began work on downgrading 1580 from a Class B to a Class D station, along with a tower relocation and a major nighttime power decrease from 50,000 watts directional to 95 watts non-directional, diplexed with KXEG west of central Phoenix. In November 2016, it was announced that KHEP was sold by Gabrielle Broadcasting to CRC Broadcasting Company, Inc., owners of business news KFNN, with the sale closing on May 1, 2017 at a price of $450,000. CRC owner Ron Cohen tapped Mike Muraco, who had been hosting a brokered sports talk show on crosstown KDUS (which he would later return to on a brokered-time basis in 2019) to develop a brand new sports station. On February 14, 2017, KQFN filed an application for a Federal Communications Commission construction permit to increase night power to 700 watts. The application was accepted for filing on February 17, 2017.

The station returned to the air on February 13, 2017, under a local marketing agreement with CRC, airing an all-sports format. On March 16, 2017, following the closing of the station's sale to CRC, KHEP changed their call letters to KQFN.

K257CD translator history
K257CD is one of Phoenix's oldest translators, having rebroadcast a number of different stations since going on air in 1984. It initially provided a simulcast of KSTM in Apache Junction, but by the mid-90s it was dependent on KRIM which itself was one of several transmitters for KBZR/KPTY. After a stint simulcasting KNRJ, it most recently served as a translator for KFNN prior to being transitioned to KQFN; at that time, KFNN built a new translator on 105.3 MHz.

References

External links
 1580 The Fanatic Facebook

 FCC History Cards for KQFN
 
 
 
 

QFN
Radio stations established in 1960
1960 establishments in Arizona
Sports radio stations in the United States
Former subsidiaries of The Walt Disney Company